Zarat (also, Zabrat; Tat: Zərat) is a village and municipality in the Siazan Rayon of Azerbaijan.  It has a population of 1,440.  The municipality consists of the villages of Zarat, Qalaşıxı, and Cəndəhar. The native people of Zarat are Tats.

References 

Populated places in Siyazan District